Vladimir Putin is a Russian politician and former intelligence officer who has been serving as the president of Russia since 2012, having previously served between 2000 and 2008. He was the prime minister of Russia from 1999 to 2000 and again from 2008 to 2012. He has received a number of awards and honours from within Russia, from academic institutions, and from foreign politicians and countries. 

Note: Shows awards and honours that were revoked in response to the 2022 Russian invasion of Ukraine.

Civilian awards presented by different countries

Honorary doctorates

Other awards

Recognition

References 

Lists of awards received by person
Awards